The Habomai Islands are a group of uninhabited islets (but for the Russian guards stationed there) in the southernmost Kuril Islands. They are currently under Russian administration, but together with Iturup (Etorofu), Kunashir (Kunashiri), and Shikotan are claimed by Japan.

History

 
In 1732 the islands were mapped during the Russian Great Eastern Expedition. The Treaty of Shimoda, signed by Russia and Japan in 1855, gave Japan ownership of Iturup, Kunashir, Shikotan, and the Habomai Islands.

The Habomai Islands were occupied by Soviet forces in the last few days of World War II. The islands were eventually annexed by the Soviet Union, which deported all the island residents to Japan. Moscow claimed the islands as part of a war-time agreement between the Allies (Yalta Agreement), which provided for the transfer of the Chishima (Kurile) Islands to the USSR in return for its participation in the Pacific War. However, Japan maintains that the Habomai Islands are not part of the Kuriles and are in fact part of Hokkaido prefecture. On May 26, 1955, the United States submitted an application for proceedings against the Soviet Union. As part of the proceedings, the United States questioned the validity of the Soviet Union's claim to the Habomai Islands.

In 1956, after difficult negotiations, the Soviet Union agreed to cede the Habomai to Japan, along with Shikotan, after the conclusion of a peace treaty between the two countries. As the treaty was never concluded, the islands remained under Soviet jurisdiction. However, the promise of a two-island solution (for the purpose of simplicity, the Habomai rocks count as one island) has been renewed in the Soviet-Japanese, and later Russo-Japanese negotiations. Formerly home to a Japanese fishing community, the islands are now uninhabited except for the Russian border guard outpost.

List of islands

See also
 Offshore islets of Shikotan

References

External links 
 Habomai islet gets Russian Orthodox church
 The Kurile Islands

Japan–Soviet Union relations
Southern Kuriles